Ismael Israel Mengs (1690 – 26 December 1765) was a Danish-born portrait painter, active mainly at the court of Dresden, Germany.

Biography 
Mengs was born in Copenhagen into a family of Jewish descent, with some sources calling him a Danish, others a Danish-born painter. He learned the art of miniature- and enamel-painting in Lübeck, and then traveled through Germany, Italy, and Austria. He was baptized as a Lutheran, before he was appointed professor at the Academy of Fine Arts in Dresden in 1714. Further, he became court painter to August III, King of Poland and of Saxony.

He was the father of Anton Rafael Mengs, whom he trained from early childhood to become a successful painter in Germany, Italy and Spain.

References

External links
 
 Painting by Ismael Mengs Madonna di Folignio at the Royal Academy of Arts

1690 births
1765 deaths
18th-century Danish painters
18th-century male artists
18th-century Jews
Danish male painters
Danish portrait painters
Jewish Danish artists
Portrait miniaturists